Wayne Earl Wendt (born 21 August 1960) is a Labor Party politician who represented the electoral district of Ipswich West in the Legislative Assembly of Queensland.

In 2016, Wendt was elected as the Division 5 Councillor of the City of Ipswich. In 2017 he was elected Deputy Mayor. On May 3, 2018, he became Acting Mayor, following the resignation by the Mayor on suspected corruption charges and served in this capacity until the dissolution of Ipswich City Council in August 2018.

References

1960 births
Living people
Members of the Queensland Legislative Assembly
Australian people of German descent
Australian Labor Party members of the Parliament of Queensland
21st-century Australian politicians